The IEEE Medal for Engineering Excellence was an award presented by the IEEE to recognize exceptional achievements in application engineering in the technical disciplines of the IEEE, for the benefit of the public and the engineering profession.  The medal was awarded to an individual or a group of up to three people. It was established by the IEEE Board of Directors in 1986 and was last awarded in 2004. 

Recipients of this medal received a gold medal, bronze replica, certificate and honorarium.

This award was discontinued in November 2009.

Recipients 

 2004: Thomas E. Neal
 2004: Richard L. Doughty
 2004: H. Landis Floyd
 2003: Ralph S. Gens
 2002: No Award
 2001: L. Bruce McClung
 2000: Cyril G. Veinott
 1999: Kiyoji Morii
 1998: C. James Erickson
 1997: John G. Anderson
 1996: John R. Dunki-Jacobs
 1995: Masasuke Morita
 1994: Heiner Sussner
 1993: Robert L. Hartman
 1993: Richard W. Dixon
 1993: Bernard C. DeLoach, Jr.
 1992: Charles Elachi
 1991: Alexander Feiner
 1990: John Alvin (Jack) Pierce, the "Father of Omega" 
 1989: Walter A. Elmore
 1988: Karl E. Martersteck, Jr.

References 

Engineering Excellence